"This Hell" is a song by Japanese-British singer-songwriter Rina Sawayama. It was released on 18 May 2022, through Dirty Hit, as the first single from her second album Hold the Girl.

Background 
In April 2020, Sawayama released her debut album, Sawayama. However, due to the COVID-19 pandemic, the Dynasty Tour was postponed twice. Sawayama teased her second album in late 2021, saying "Next year, late summer", and played a new song called "Catch Me in the Air" while announcing she was finishing her "even more personal" second album. On 16 May 2022, Sawayama announced her second album, Hold the Girl. On the 17th, one day after, she announced the lead single "This Hell" would release the day after. "This Hell" is the first solo song by Sawayama since "Lucid" was released in 2020.

Composition 
"This Hell" is a "glammy, country pop inspired" song which contains references to numerous country and western motifs such as cowboys and horseriding. It was produced by Paul Epworth and Clarence Clarity, and written by Sawayama alongside Vic Jamieson, Epworth, and Lauren Aquilina.

Sawayama has noted Dolly Parton and Kacey Musgraves as inspirations for "This Hell", as well as Shania Twain, whom Sawayama has described as "The queen of country pop".

Sawayama wrote "This Hell" while reflecting about attacks against LGBT people, which are often motivated by religious beliefs, stating: "When the world tells us we don't deserve love and protection, we have no choice but to give love and protection to each other".
The song contains a guitar solo which was described as "over-the-top" by NPR. The singer makes references to some gay icons such as Britney Spears, Princess Diana, and Whitney Houston, and references Shania Twain’s "Man! I Feel Like a Woman!" with the beginning line, "Let's go, girls", as well as Paris Hilton's signature catchphrase "that's hot". Sawayama stated: “I put in as many iconic pop culture moments as I can, but the song is more than that.” 
Upon the song's release, Sawayama posted to Twitter: "I wanted to write a western pop song that celebrated COMMUNITY and LOVE in a time where the world seemed hellish."

Music video 
A music video for "This Hell" was described as "glitzy" by NME. The visual, directed by Ali Kaur, depicts the singer getting married to two people in a lavish wedding, all while drinking, line-dancing, and playing air guitar. Adrian Garro for Rock Cellar Magazine noted that the video was released during gay pride month.

Live performances 
Sawayama performed "This Hell" on The Tonight Show Starring Jimmy Fallon. On October 30, 2022, Sawayama performed the song on British television dance contest Strictly Come Dancing.

Personnel 
 Rina Sawayama – performer, songwriter
 Paul Epworth – producer, songwriter
 Clarence Clarity – producer
 Lauren Aquilina – songwriter
 Vic Jamieson – songwriter

Critical response 
"This Hell" received critical acclaim. From over 20 outlets, global critic aggregator Acclaimed Music placed "This Hell" as the 33rd best song of 2022. Rolling Stone listed "This Hell" as one of the best songs of 2022, placing it at number 15, and wrote: "Artists from other genres dabbling in country music is nothing new, but Sawayama does it better than nearly anyone here, proving she’s just trying to have a good time — while also inspiring change." Billboard ranked named the 68th best song of the year.

Charts

References 

2022 songs
Dirty Hit singles
Rina Sawayama songs
Song recordings produced by Paul Epworth
Songs written by Paul Epworth
Songs written by Lauren Aquilina
Songs written by Rina Sawayama